Living is a 2012 Russian drama film directed by Vasily Sigarev.

The film premiered at the 2012 International Film Festival Rotterdam.

Plot 
The film tells about people who can't put up with the loss of loved ones and declare war on fate.

Cast 
 Olga Lapshina as Kapustina
 Marina Gavrilova as Kapustina's daughter
 Sasha Gavrilova as Kapustina's daughter
 Yana Troyanova as Grishka
 Aleksey Filimonov as Anton
 Aleksei Pustovoitev as Artyom
 Yevgeniy Syty as Artyom's father
 Anna Ukolova as Artyom's mother
 Dmitriy Kulichkov as Igor
 Alyona Lapteva as policewoman
 Irma Arendt as fat woman

Awards 

 2012 Kinotavr: Best Director
 2012 Thessaloniki Film Festival: Special Artistic Achievement 
 2012 Wiesbaden goEast: Golden Lily and FIPRESCI Prize

References

External links 
 

2012 films
2010s Russian-language films
Russian drama films
2012 drama films